Matthew S. Levatich (born January 7, 1965) is an American businessman, and was the president and CEO of Harley-Davidson from May 2015 through February 2020

Early life
Levatich was born on January 7, 1965, in Tompkins County Hospital, Ithaca, New York. He was educated at Caroline Elementary School, DeWitt Junior High School and Ithaca High School.

Levatich earned a bachelor's degree in mechanical engineering from Rensselaer Polytechnic Institute, a master's degree in engineering management, and an MBA in marketing, finance and organizational behavior from Northwestern University.

Career
Levatich joined Harley-Davidson in 1994 and served as chief operating officer between 2009 and 2015. In May 2015, Levatich became its CEO.

In February 2020, Levatich resigned as CEO of Harley-Davidson and vacated his seat on the board of directors.

Personal life
He is married to Brenda, they have two sons, live in Mequon, Wisconsin, and celebrated 25 years of marriage in 2015.

References

1965 births
Living people
American chief executives
Businesspeople from New York (state)
Businesspeople from Wisconsin
Rensselaer Polytechnic Institute alumni
Northwestern University alumni
People from Ithaca, New York
People from Mequon, Wisconsin
Harley-Davidson executives
Ithaca High School (Ithaca, New York) alumni